Loved by Thousands, Hated by Millions is a compilation album of songs from American crossover thrash band, M.O.D. It was released in 1995 on Megaforce Records and contains material from the band's first three albums – U.S.A. for M.O.D., Gross Misconduct, and Rhythm of Fear – and the EP, Surfin' M.O.D.. It also contains a number of new songs which were previously not on any other album.

Songs from the band's previous album, 1994's Devolution, were not included on this compilation because it was their first for another label. All albums up until then had been on Megaforce Records. Dictated Aggression, their subsequent album, was on Music For Nations.

Track listing

Credits
 Billy Milano – vocals, bass
 Tim McMurtrie – guitar
 John Pereksta – guitar
 Louis Svitek – guitar
 Joe Young – guitar
 Scott Ian – acoustic guitar
 Ken Balone – bass
 John Monte – bass
 Rob Moschetti – bass
 John Pereksta – bass
 Dave Chavarri – drums
 Keith Davis – drums
 Tim Mallare – drums
 Darren Verpeut – drums
 Recorded at Pyramid Sound, Ithaca, New York, and Trax East Studios, South River, New Jersey, USA
 Produced by Steve Evetts, Rob Hunter, Scott Ian, Billy Milano, Alex Perialas, and Ernie Schaeffer
 Edited by Rob Hunter at Pyramid Sound
 Cover art by Anthony Ferrara

Miscellanea 
The quote "Loved by Thousands, Hated by Millions" first appears in the 1975 Paul Bartel's movie Death Race 2000 when a television reporter introduces Machine Gun Joe Viterbo. Machine Gun Joe Viterbo was played by Sylvester Stallone.

References

External links
Megaforce Records album page
MOD and SOD official fansite
BNR Metal discography page

1995 compilation albums
M.O.D. albums
Albums produced by Steve Evetts
Megaforce Records compilation albums